Knockanore Mountain is a large hill North Kerry, Ireland.

Geography 
Its top hosts some broadcasting masts and a triangulation station. The hill is visible in the distance and the summit offers a good view on Shannon Estuary and a large part of Kerry's Atlantic coastline.

Name 
The English meaning of Cnoc an Fhómhair is hill of the autumn.

Access to the summit 
Knockanore summit can be accessed by a very short walk from the nearest road.

Nature 
The bogs surrounding the Knockanore are cited on The Irish naturalist, and are considered very interesting from the entomologist's point of view.

See also 
 List of Marilyns in Ireland

References

Mountains and hills of County Kerry
Marilyns of Ireland